Global Airways is an Air Charter airline based at the Providenciales International Airport which is the main airport of the Turks and Caicos Islands.

Destinations
Global Airways serves the following destinations:
Grand Turk
Middle Caicos
North Caicos
Pine Cay
Providenciales "Provo"
Salt Cay, Turks Islands
South Caicos

The airline also offers charters to other Caribbean islands.

Fleet
Piper Aztec 2
Cessna 401 1

External links

Airlines of the Turks and Caicos Islands